Empire Bede was a  cargo ship which was built by G M Harland & Wolff Ltd, Glasgow in 1942 for the Ministry of War Transport (MoWT). She had a short career, being damaged by a torpedo and then sunk by gunfire on 18 August 1942.

Description
Empire Bede was built by Harland & Wolff Ltd, Glasgow. She was yard number 1049. Empire Bede was launched on 6 January 1942 and completed on 31 March. Her GRT was 6,959 with a NRT of 4,201.

Career
Empire Bede had a short career, she was a member of two convoys.

OS 25
Convoy OS 25 departed Liverpool on 12 April 1942 and arrived at Freetown, Sierra Leone on 29 April. Empire Bede was carrying a cargo of ammunition, guns, stores and tanks.

After leaving the convoy off Freetown, Empire Bede delivered her cargo to Aden and Port Said, Egypt. She then sailed to Port Sudan where a load of cotton was taken aboard. Empire Bede sailed to Cape Town and then departed for New York. On 1 August she picked up 25 survivors from the Clan Line ship , which had been torpedoed and sunk by U-155. They were landed at Port of Spain, Trinidad on 5 August.

TAW 13
Convoy TAW 13 departed from Trinidad on 12 August 1942 and arrived at Key West, Florida on 23 August. Empire Bede carried the Vice-Commodore. At 04:00 British Double Summer Time (06:00 German time) on 12 August, Empire Bede was struck by a torpedo fired by U-553, under the command of Kapitänleutnant Karl Thurmann. Two crew were killed. The rescued crew were landed at Santiago de Cuba. Those lost on Empire Bede are commemorated at the Tower Hill Memorial, London.

Official Numbers and Code Letters

Official Numbers were a forerunner to IMO Numbers. Empire Bede had the UK Official Number 1687091 and the Code Letters BCVC.

Propulsion

Empire Bede was propelled by a four-stroke Single Cycle, Single Action diesel engine which had six cylinders of  diameter by  stroke. It was built by Harland & Wolff.

References

1942 ships
Ships built in Govan
Empire ships
Steamships of the United Kingdom
Ministry of War Transport ships
Ships sunk by German submarines in World War II
World War II shipwrecks in the Caribbean Sea
Maritime incidents in August 1942
Ships built by Harland and Wolff